Skammestein is a village in Øystre Slidre Municipality in Innlandet county, Norway. The village is located on a hillside overlooking the east shore of the lake Hedalsfjorden. Lidar Church is located in the village, along the Norwegian County Road 51.

References

Øystre Slidre
Villages in Innlandet